Hardy's inequality is an inequality in mathematics, named after G. H. Hardy. It states that if  is a sequence of non-negative real numbers, then for every real number p > 1 one has

If the right-hand side is finite, equality holds if and only if  for all n.

An integral version of Hardy's inequality states the following: if f is a measurable function with non-negative values, then

If the right-hand side is finite, equality holds if and only if f(x) = 0 almost everywhere.

Hardy's inequality was first published and proved (at least the discrete version with a worse constant) in 1920 in a note by Hardy. The original formulation was in an integral form slightly different from the above.

General one-dimensional version  

The general weighted one dimensional version reads as follows:
 If , then 
 
 If , then

Multidimensional  version

In the multidimensional case, Hardy's inequality can be extended to -spaces, taking the form 

where , and where the constant  is known to be sharp.

Fractional Hardy inequality

Proof of the inequality

Integral version 
Finally, by another change of variables, the last expression equals  .

Discrete version: from the continuous version 
This allows us to construct a decreasing sequence  containing the same positive terms as the original sequence (but possibly no zero terms). Since  for every n, it suffices to show the inequality for the new sequence. This follows directly from the integral form, defining  if  and  otherwise.

Discrete version: Direct proof

Let  and let  be positive real numbers. Set  First we prove the inequality  , 

We have: 

or

According to Young's inequality we have:

from which it follows that:

By telescoping we have:

proving . By applying Hölder's inequality to the RHS of  we have:

from which we immediately obtain:

Letting  we obtain Hardy's inequality.

See also
 Carleman's inequality

Notes

References

 .

External links
 

Inequalities
Theorems in real analysis